These are the results of the women's 63 kg (also known as half-middleweight) competition in judo at the 2000 Summer Olympics in Sydney.  A total of 22 women qualified for this event, limited to jūdōka whose body weight was less than, or equal to, 63 kilograms.  Competition took place in the Sydney Convention and Exhibition Centre on 19 September.

Competitors

Main bracket 
The gold and silver medalists were determined by the final match of the main single-elimination bracket.

Repechage
The losing semifinalists as well as those judoka eliminated in earlier rounds by the four semifinalists of the main bracket advanced to the repechage.  These matches determined the two bronze medalists for the event.

References

External links
 
 Official report

W63
Judo at the Summer Olympics Women's Half Middleweight
Olympics W63
Women's events at the 2000 Summer Olympics